Mona Parsa (born April 2, 1982 in Orange County, California) is an attorney, author and speaker.

Education

Parsa attended law school at Whittier Law School. She received her Bachelor of Arts degree in Political Science with an emphasis in International Relations from the University of California, Irvine, graduating summa cum laude.

Career

Parsa started her legal career as an In-house Legal Counsel for the California Statewide Law Enforcement Association (CSLEA). She then began her work in immigration, where she acquired a niche expertise in preparing visas and green card petitions for those who reached the top of their fields, from scientists to business professionals to entertainment artists.

In 2009, she completed an assignment with the U.S. Commission on International Religious Freedom (USCIRF) in Washington, D.C. Her primary role at USCIRF was to assist in preparing the Commission's annual religious freedom and human rights report that serves as a major basis for foreign policy-making by the U.S. President and Congress. In 2011, she was requested to assist the delegation of the Bahá'í International Community at the 16th Session of the United Nations Human Rights Council in Geneva, Switzerland. She also attended and reported on relevant public events and hearings, and was with USCIRF when the most recent attacks against the Bahá'ís in Iran commenced.

Parsa is former Miss Teenage Laguna Niguel titleholder and a Miss Teenage California finalist. She was selected by WE Magazine for Women as a "2015 Woman on the Move".

Parsa is the author/publisher of the children's book and interactive app, And So You Were Born. The book app has reached the Top 100 position on iTunes charts in over 20 countries. Upon customer request, the app was then published as a print gift book version. The print book received a 2014 Moonbeam Children's Book Award.

Parsa is co-editor of Legal Briefs on Immigration Reform from 25 of the Top Legal Minds in the Country. The book featured contributions from top lawyers and policymakers regarding their thoughts and suggestions on immigration reform.

Parsa has appeared as a guest contributor on such shows as KMAX Good Day Sacramento, WMCN-TV Philadelphia and Healthy Lifestyle with Eraldo. Parsa served as co-executive and Chase Producer for the Deborah Interviews Show.

Parsa was Associate Producer of the 40 Point Plan, a film about the dramatic change throughout the world due to implementation of a new business based on love.

Parsa has been hosting Soul Food, a monthly public event in Orange County providing inspirational readings and music, since 2010.

In 2013, Parsa was selected to serve as a member of the International Jury of the Plural + Youth Video Festival, held by the United Nations Alliance of Civilizations (UNAOC) and the International Organization for Migration (IOM).

References

External links 
 

1982 births
21st-century American writers
American women lawyers
California lawyers
Living people
People from Orange County, California
Writers from California
21st-century American women writers